The Rau railway station is one of the local railway stations in Rau, a suburb of Indore.

Rau is situated on rail line from Ratlam to Akola. Rail line is now converted from meter-gauge to broad-gauge between Ratlam and Mhow. Rau is well connected to Indore, Ratlam, Mhow, Khandwa, Akola and Ujjain. Nearest broad-gauge railway station is the main railway station that is at Indore BG which is 18 km away. The next nearest stations are Mhow (Dr. Ambedkar Nagar railway station) towards the south which is around 13 km to the south and Tihi which is the on the new Indore–Dahod & Indore–Chota Udepur railway line which is under construction. Rau is soon to be an official junction once the aforementioned lines become fully operational for passengers. The new line which diverges to the west is single line broad-gauge and non-electrified railway line mainly used to transport containers from Pithampur dry containers port near Tihi. The new railway line from Rau is laid till Tihi and the is under progress at snails pace. In 2008, the Union Cabinet approved the gauge conversion for the Ratlam–Mhow-Khandwa–Akola railway line.(472.64 km). The cost of the gauge conversion would be about Rs.1421.25 crore.

Major trains
The following trains have stoppage at the station.

See also
 Akola–Ratlam metre-gauge line

References

Railway stations in Indore
Ratlam railway division
Railway stations in Indore district
Year of establishment missing